Lasta (full legal name: Saobraćajno preduzeće Lasta a.d. Beograd) is a Serbian bus company headquartered in Belgrade, Serbia. It is part of the pan-European Eurolines network and operates bus coaches on a comprehensive network of routes throughout Serbia and Europe.

History

Lasta was established on 18 February 1947. In the first two decades of existence, it operated mainly as cargo transporter and partially as passenger carrier. Since the late 1960s, it operated only as passenger transporter.

Today, Lasta provides public transport within the city of Belgrade, intercity routes to all parts of Serbia, as well as international routes to destinations in Europe. Its bus line from Belgrade (Serbia) to Paris (France) is in function over 40 years. With about 1,000 buses and coaches, "Lasta" is the carrier of the suburban transport in Belgrade, Kragujevac, Aranđelovac and other municipalities in Central Serbia. In suburban transport of Belgrade, Lasta takes a part with about 300 buses. Domestically, Lasta owns Lastra Lazarevac, another bus transport company which has around 100 buses. In its ownership, Lasta has 35% of shares of Panonijabus.

In August 2019, Lasta introduced 30 new buses in its fleet, manufactured by Turkish TEMSA. In November 2020, the Government of Serbia announced that it will be seeking new owners of several large companies owned by the Government through the privatization process, among them being Lasta Beograd as well.

Market and financial data
As of 22 March 2019, Lasta Beograd has a market capitalization of 11.50 million euros.

Vehicle fleet

Tourist buses
 Otokar Navigo F 185S
 SOR LH 12
 TEMSA Opalin
 TEMSA Tourmalin
 VDL Berkhof Axial 50
 VDL Berkhof Excellence 3000 HD
 Mercedes-Benz O560 Intouro RH

Intercity buses
 VDL Berkhof Bova Lexio 130-310
 Ikarbus IK-312

Suburban buses
 SOR C-12
 FAP A-537
 Karsan J10
 Mercedes-Benz UO345 Conecto

City buses
 Ikarbus IK-103
 Ikarbus IK-206
 Ikarbus IK-218N 
 Ikarbus IK-112LE 
 Neobus Citta SLF
 Neobus Citta LEA

References

External links
 

1947 establishments in Serbia
Bus companies of Serbia
Companies based in Belgrade
Coach transport in Serbia
Serbian brands
Transport companies established in 1947